Aesculus glabra, commonly known as Ohio buckeye, is a species of tree in the soapberry family (Sapindaceae) native to North America.

Its natural range is primarily in the Midwestern and lower Great Plains regions of the United States, extending southeast into the geological Black Belt of Alabama and Mississippi. It is also found locally in the extreme southwest of Ontario, on Walpole Island in Lake St. Clair.

It is found in a variety of natural habitats, including streambanks, upland mesic forests, and along the margins of old fields. It is typically found in calcareous areas.

Description 

The fruit is a round capsule  diameter, containing one nut-like seed,  in diameter, brown with a whitish basal scar.

The inedible seeds contain tannic acid and are poisonous to cattle and humans. The young foliage, shoots, and bark are also poisonous to some degree.
However, Native Americans reportedly did eat buckeye fruit after boiling it to extract tannin.

Uses
Aesculus glabra has little use as a timber tree due to its soft, light wood. Although occasionally seen in cultivation, the large, copiously produced fruits make it generally undesirable as a street tree.

Native American ethnobotany
The Lenape carry the nuts in their pockets for rheumatism, and an infusion of ground nuts is mixed with sweet oil or mutton tallow for earaches. They also grind the nuts and use them to poison fish in streams.

Native Americans blanched buckeye nuts, extracting the tannic acid for use in making leather. The nuts can also be dried, turning dark as they harden with exposure to the air, and strung into necklaces similar to those made from the kukui nut in Hawaii.

Culture

The Ohio buckeye is the state tree of Ohio, and its name is an original term of endearment for the pioneers on the Ohio frontier. Subsequently, "buckeye" came to be used as the nickname and colloquial name for people from Ohio. Ohio State University adopted "Buckeyes" officially as its nickname in 1950, and also uses the name for its sports teams. It came to be applied to any student or graduate of the university.

Buckeye candy, made to resemble the tree's nut, is made by dipping a ball of peanut butter fudge in milk chocolate, leaving a circle of the peanut butter exposed. These are a popular treat in Ohio, especially during the Christmas and college football seasons.

Buckeyes (the nuts) are a recurring theme in Bill Watterson's comic, Calvin and Hobbes, often as one of Calvin's tools of torment. Watterson himself grew up in Chagrin Falls, Ohio.

References

Further reading
Darbyshire, S. J., & Oldham, M. J. (1985). "Ohio buckeye, Aesculus glabra, on Walpole Island, Lambton County, Ontario". Canad. Field-Nat. 99: 370–372.
Farrar, J. R. (1995).  "Ohio Buckeye".  Trees in Canada.  Fitzhenry & Whiteside Ltd. (Markham, Ontario) and the Canadian Forest Service (Ottawa).  p. 157.

External links

National Register of Big Trees
Aesculus glabra images at bioimages.vanderbilt.edu
Winter ID pictures

glabra
Plants used in traditional Native American medicine
Symbols of Ohio
Trees of Ontario
Trees of the Great Lakes region (North America)
Trees of the North-Central United States
Trees of the Northeastern United States
Trees of the Plains-Midwest (United States)
Trees of the South-Central United States
Trees of the Southeastern United States
Trees of the Southern United States
Trees of the United States